The 2011 World Seniors Championship (known for sponsorship reasons as the Wyldecrest Park Homes World Seniors Championship) was a snooker tournament that took place between 5–6 November 2011 at the East of England Showground in Peterborough, England. The age criterion was raised from 40 to 45 compared to 2010.

Jimmy White was the defending champion, but he lost in the semi-finals 0–2 against Darren Morgan.

Darren Morgan won in the final 2–1 against Steve Davis. During the final Morgan also made the highest break of the tournament, an 86 in the penultimate frame.

Prize fund
The breakdown of prize money for this year is shown below:
Winner: £18,000 
Runner-up: £8,000
Semi-finalist: £4,000
Quarter-finalist: £2,000
Last 16: £1,000
Round 3: £750

Total: £53,000

Main draw
The draw for the last 16 was made on the evening of 1 September 2011 at the Guildford Spectrum during the Premier League. The draw for quarter-finals and semi-finals were made on a random basis. All matches were best of 3 frames. Matches were played on a roll on/roll off basis. Play started at the allocated time each day with a 15-minute interval between matches, except the final after a 20-minute interval. The evening session didn't start before the time indicated on the format. All frames were subjected to a 30-second shot clock after ten minutes of play and the miss rule was altered so "" anywhere on the table was awarded after the third miss. All times are GMT.

Last 16

 Saturday, 5 November – 13:00
  Tony Drago 1–2  Steve Davis
  Dene O'Kane 2–1  Neal Foulds
  Karl Townsend 2–0  Steve Ventham
  John Parrott 2–1  Joe Johnson

 Saturday, 5 November – 19:00
  Jimmy White 2–0  Tony Knowles
  Nigel Bond 0–2  Dennis Taylor
  Gary Wilkinson 0–2  Darren Morgan
  Cliff Thorburn 2–1  Doug Mountjoy

Quarter-finals
 Sunday, 6 November – 13:00
  Dene O'Kane 0–2  Steve Davis
  Darren Morgan 2–0  Cliff Thorburn
  Dennis Taylor 0–2  Jimmy White
  John Parrott 2–1  Karl Townsend

Semi-finals
 Sunday, 6 November – 19:00
  Steve Davis 2–0  John Parrott
  Jimmy White 0–2  Darren Morgan

Final
 Sunday, 6 November – 19:00
  Steve Davis 1–2  Darren Morgan

Qualifying
These matches took place on 10 October 2011 at the South West Snooker Academy, Gloucester, England. There was only one century break during the qualifying. Tony Chappel made a 101 break against David Taylor.

Notes
 After Alain Robidoux withdrew from the competition, due to an ear operation, Doug Mountjoy was handed a place in the final stages of the competition and the winner of the match between Gary Miller and Gary Wilkinson received a bye into the last qualifying round.

References

2011
World Seniors Championship
World Seniors Championship
Sport in Peterborough